Wick is an unincorporated community in Ashtabula County, in the U.S. state of Ohio.

History
A post office called Wick was established in 1890, and remained in operation until 1904. The community has the name of William Wick, a local minister.

References

Unincorporated communities in Ashtabula County, Ohio
1890 establishments in Ohio
Populated places established in 1890
Unincorporated communities in Ohio